The Roman Catholic Archdiocese of Tororo is the Metropolitan See for the Ecclesiastical province of Tororo in Uganda.

On January 2, 2014, it was announced that the Bishop of Soroti, Uganda, Emmanuel Obbo, had been named by Pope Francis to be the new Archbishop of Tororo.

History
 July 13, 1894: Established as the Apostolic Vicariate of Upper Nile from the Apostolic Vicariate of Victoria–Nyanza
 May 10, 1951: Renamed as Apostolic Vicariate of Tororo 
 March 25, 1953: Promoted as Diocese of Tororo
 January 2, 1999: Promoted as Metropolitan Archdiocese of Tororo

Special churches
The seat of the archbishop is the Uganda Martyrs’ Cathedral in Tororo.

Leadership
 Metropolitan Archbishops of Tororo (Roman rite)
 Archbishop Denis Kiwanuka Lote (September 22, 2007 - January 2, 2014)
 Archbishop James Odongo (January 2, 1999 - September 22, 2007)
 Bishops of Tororo (Roman rite) 
 Archbishop James Odongo (August 19, 1968 – January 2, 1999)
 Bishop John Francis Greif, M.H.M. (March 25, 1953 – August 17, 1968)
 Vicars Apostolic of Tororo (Roman rite) 
 Bishop John Francis Greif, M.H.M. (May 1, 1951 – March 25, 1953)
 Vicars Apostolic of Upper Nile (Roman rite) 
 Bishop John Reesinck, M.H.M. (March 29, 1938 – March 1951)
 Bishop John William Campling, M.H.M. (May 13, 1925 – February 1938)
 Bishop Johannes Biermans, M.H.M. (April 27, 1912 – 1924)
 Bishop Henry Hanlon, M.H.M. (July 17, 1894 – November 17, 1911)

Suffragan Dioceses
 Jinja
 Kotido
 Moroto
 Soroti

See also
Roman Catholicism in Uganda
Tororo

References

External links

 GCatholic.org
 Catholic Hierarchy
 Tororo archdiocese

Tororo
Roman Catholic dioceses in Uganda
Religious organizations established in 1894
Roman Catholic dioceses and prelatures established in the 19th century
Tororo District
1894 establishments in Uganda